Soul of a Robot is a video game sequel to Nonterraqueous for the ZX Spectrum, Amstrad CPC and MSX, released by Mastertronic in 1985. It was sometimes called Nonterraqueous 2.

Plot 
The attempt to destroy the rogue computer from Nonterraqueous failed.  Now the computer threatens to self-destruct with old age, taking the planet Nonterraqueous with it. The people of the planet create another robot, one with the mind of a man. On a kamikaze mission to the computer's core, it must locate the three keys to allow it to transport to the next section, before self-destructing inside the computer's core.

Gameplay 
Gameplay is rather different from the prequel Nonterraqueous. The robot which is controlled by the player does not "fly" like in the previous game but leaps rather like an ordinary platform game. However, the ability to fly is available in the game, and necessary to complete it. The robot still has a "psyche" value which must not be allowed to decrease to zero and which decreases with certain actions.  The "laser" from the previous game also remains.

The game was considered much more difficult than its prequel, relying on perfectly timed and aimed jumps (the player is able to choose five "strengths" of jump) in order to progress, and enjoyed much less commercial success. The gameplay was much slower and jumps and flying can take a lot of time and effort to perform correctly. There also seems to be a certain influence from Underwurlde in the gameplay and sounds used in the game.

Soul of a Robot was also a much smaller game, the map containing only a third as many individual screens as its prequel, with only 256 rooms.

External links

Soul of a Robot at CPC Wiki

1985 video games
ZX Spectrum games
Amstrad CPC games
MSX games
Mastertronic games
Video games about robots
Video games developed in the United Kingdom
Video games set on fictional planets